This is a list of books which have been featured on BBC Radio 4's Book of the Week during 2014.

January
 06-10 – The Telling Room by Michael Paterniti, read by Will Adamsdale.
 13–17 – Priscilla: The Hidden Life of an Englishwoman in Wartime France by Nicholas Shakespeare, read by author.
 20–24 – Gold: The Race for the World's Most Seductive Metal by Matthew Hart, read by author.
 27–31 – White Beech: The Rainforest Years by Germaine Greer, read by author.

February
 03-07 – Where Memories Go: Why Dementia Changes Everything by Sally Magnusson, read by author.
 10–14 – The Almost Nearly Perfect People: The Truth About the Nordic Miracle by Michael Booth, read by Gunnar Cauthery.
 17–21 – The Last Asylum by Barbara Taylor, read by Maggie Steed.
 24–28 – Twelve Years a Slave by Solomon Northup, read by Rhashan Stone.

March
 03-07 – The Fun Stuff by James Wood, read by Peter Firth.
 10–14 – A Sense of Direction by Gideon Lewis-Kraus, read by Patrick Kennedy.
 17–21 – Free at Last - The Benn Diaries 1991 to 2001 by Tony Benn, read by author.
 24–28 – A Spy Among Friends by Ben Macintyre, read by Simon Russell Beale.
 31-04 – The Unexpected Professor by John Carey,  read by Nicholas Farrell.

April
 07-11 – Louis Armstrong: Master of Modernism by Thomas Brothers, read by Colin McFarlane.
 14–18 – B is for Bauhaus: An A-Z of the Modern World by Deyan Sudjic, read by author.
 21–24 – The Land Where Lemons Grow by Helena Attlee, read by Francesca Dymond.
 28-02 – The Valley by Richard Benson, read by Richard Stacey.

May
 05-09 – Eleanor Marx: A Life by Rachel Holmes, read by Tracy-Ann Oberman.
 12–16 – Gironimo! Riding the Very Terrible 1914 Tour of Italy by Tim Moore, read by Stephen Mangan.
 19–23 – Stringer: A Reporter's Journey in the Congo by Anjan Sundaram, read by Riz Ahmed.
 26–30 – Doubling Back by Linda Cracknell, read by Teresa Gallagher.

June
 02-06 – A Broken Hallelujah: Leonard Cohen's Secret Chord by Liel Leibovitz, read by Julian Barrett and Colin Stinton.
 09-13 – Curious: True Stories and Loose Connections by Rebecca Front, read by author.
 16–20 – As I Walked Out One Midsummer Morning by Laurie Lee, read by Tobias Menzies.
 30-04 – Last Days of the Bus Club by Chris Stewart, read by the author.

July
 07-11 – The Zhivago Affair by Peter Finn and Petra Couvee, read by Nigel Anthony.
 14–18 – Last Man Off by Matt Lewis, read by Sam Troughton.
 21–25 – Deep by James Nestor, read by the author.
 28-01 – Cold Blood by Richard Kerridge, read by Robert Powell.

August
 04-08 – In Montmartre by Sue Roe, read by Stella Gonet.
 11–15 – Mona Lisa: A Life Discovered by Dianne Hales, read by Nancy Crane.
 18–22 – On Silbury Hill by Adam Thorpe, read by the author.
 25–29 – Philip Larkin: Life, Art and Love by James Booth, read by Michael Pennington.

September
 01-05 – Hopeful: The Autobiography by Omid Djalili, read by the author.
 08-12 – Sapiens: A Brief History of Humankind by Yuval Noah Harari, read by Adrian Scarborough.
 15–19 – Please, Mr. Postman by Alan Johnson, read by the author.
 22–26 – Tennessee Williams: Mad Pilgrimage of the Flesh by  John Lahr, read by Damian Lewis.

October
There are no books listed for October.

November
 10–15 Forensics: The Anatomy of Crime – Val McDermid
 17–21 Not My Father's Son: A Family Memoir – Alan Cumming
 24–29 My Life in Houses – Margaret Forster

December
 01-05 Discontent and Its Civilisations – Mohsin Hamid
 08-12 Elsa Schiaparelli: A Biography – Meryle Secrest
 15–20
 22–27 Stories in the Stars – Susanna Hislop
 Schubert's Winter Journey – Ian Bostridge

References

Lists of books
Lists of radio series episodes